Pulhuthivakkam, also spelled Puzhuthivakkam, is a station under construction on the Chennai MRTS in Chennai, India. The station exclusively serves the Chennai MRTS and serves the neighbourhood of Velachery.

History
Pulhuthivakkam station was expected to be opened in 2013, as part of the second phase extension of the Chennai MRTS network, but construction was still under way in 2022. As of February 2019, it is still under construction. With the court dismissing all the cases against land acquisition for construction of railway line in 2018, the station is expected to be completed by the end of 2019.

Service and connections
Pulhuthivakkam station will be the 19th station on the MRTS line to St. Thomas Mount. In the return direction from St. Thomas Mount, it will be the third station towards Chennai Beach station.

See also

 Chennai MRTS
 Chennai suburban railway
 Chennai Metro
 Transport in Chennai

References

Chennai Mass Rapid Transit System stations
Railway stations in Chennai